The 1964 season of the Paraguayan Primera División, the top category of Paraguayan football, was played by 10 teams. The national champions were Guaraní.

Results

Standings

Promotion/relegation play-offs

References

External links
Paraguay 1964 season at RSSSF

Para
Paraguayan Primera División seasons
Primera